Michaela Matejová (born 2 March 1986) is a Slovak retired ice hockey defenseman and former member of the Slovak national ice hockey team.

Playing career
Matejová's senior club career began with the women's representative team of HC Slovan Bratislava during the 2002–03 season of the Slovak  ('1st Women's League') and she remained with the team through the 2007–08 season. HC Slovan also began participating in the Elite Women's Hockey League (EWHL) during the 2005–06 season, and Matejová was an EWHL Champion with the team in 2006 and 2007.  

At age 22, she opted to play abroad and signed with Oulun Kärpät Naiset in Finland's top league, the Naisten SM-sarja (rebranded as Naisten Liiga in 2017). The only import player on the team's otherwise Finnish 2008–09 roster, Matejová counted among her teammates Olympian Saija Tarkki and future Olympians Anne Helin, Satu Kiipeli, Mira Kuisma, and Mira Jalosuo, in addition to a number of other Finnish national team players. Her production ranked third for Kärpät defensemen – trailing only Tarkki and Jalosuo – with 2 goals and 5 assists for 7 points in 22 games played. After finishing the regular season in fourth place, Kärpät lost the Naisten SM-sarja bronze medal match to HPK Kiekkonaiset in overtime. 

Continuing to push her development in the 2009–10 season, she signed with the women's representative team of SC Reinach in the Swiss Leistungsklasse A (LKA; known as SWHL A during 2014–2019 and Women's League since 2019). She was once again the only import player on the team's roster, playing alongside Swiss 2010 Olympians Melanie Häfliger, Claudia Riechsteiner, and Anja Stiefel, and future Swiss ice hockey icon Lara Stalder, who was fifteen years old at the time. She tallied a goal and 4 assists for 5 points in fifteen games played, as SC Reinach finished the regular season fourth in the standings. Reinach achieved an overtime victory against DHC Langenthal in the bronze medal game to claim third place medals in the LKA Championship.

International play 
Matejová represented Slovakia at six IIHF Women's World Championship tournaments across three divisions. Her first appearance with the senior national team came at the Division II tournament in 2005. She was one of Slovakia's top scoring defensemen at the Division II tournament in 2007, netting 2 goals and 2 assists for 4 points in five games played and contributing to the team's promotion to Division I.

In 2008, she participated in the pre-qualification and qualification tournaments for the 2010 Winter Olympics, at which Slovakia qualified for the Olympic women's ice hockey tournament for the first time. She also played in the 2008 IIHF Women's World Championship Division I, recording an assist in five games played.

Representing Slovakia with the national under-25 ice hockey team in the women's ice hockey tournament at the 2009 Winter Universiade in Harbin, Matejová tallied 4 points in seven games played, with a goal and 3 assists. Later that year, she notched an assist at the 2009 IIHF Women's World Championship Division I, as Slovakia earned their first promotion to the Top Division tournament.

As a part of the Slovak delegation at the 2010 Winter Olympics in Vancouver, Matejová played in all four of Slovakia's matches in the women's ice hockey tournament. She also participated in the 2010 and 2014 Olympic qualification tournaments.

In Slovakia's Top Division debut at the 2011 IIHF Women's World Championship, Matejová was one of only six Slovak players to record a point during the tournament. She earned a primary assist on Iveta Karafiátová's equalizing goal against  in game two of the relegation round, which pushed the game into overtime before Martina Veličková scored in the shootout to win the game and retain Slovakia's place in the Top Division.

After sitting out the 2011–12 international season, Matejová appeared in the qualification tournament for the 2014 Winter Olympics, however the team did not qualify. Her last major event with the national team was the Division I Group A tournament of the 2013 IIHF Women's World Championship, at which she was Slovakia’s top scoring defenseman with 2 goals and an assist for 3 points in five games played.

Career statistics

References

External links
 
 
  at Hockey Slovakia 

1986 births
Living people
Ice hockey players at the 2010 Winter Olympics
Oulun Kärpät Naiset players
Olympic ice hockey players of Slovakia
Sportspeople from Martin, Slovakia
Slovak women's ice hockey defencemen
Slovak expatriate ice hockey players in Switzerland
Slovak expatriate ice hockey players in Finland